The following are the national records in athletics in Sri Lanka maintained by Sri Lanka Athletics (SLA).

Outdoor

Key to tables:

+ = en route to a longer distance

h = hand timing

NWI = no wind information

A = affected by altitude

OT = oversized track (> 200m in circumference)

a = aided road course

Men

Women

Mixed

Indoor

Men

Women

Notes

References
General
National Institute of Sport Science: Sri Lankan Outdoor records 31 May 2022 updated
World Athletics Statistic Handbook 2022: National Indoor Records
Specific

External links
Sri Lanka Athletics official website

Sri Lanka
Records
Athletics